Jeffrey "Jeff" Riseley (born 11 November 1986 in Dandenong) is an Australian middle-distance athlete. Riseley competed in the 2008, 2012, 2016 and 2020 Summer Olympics.

Early years
Riseley was seven when he began to participate in athletics.  His family encouraged him as it would enable him to meet other children after the family had moved house. Riseley joined the under 8's at Dandenong Little Athletics and competed until he was 12. He lost interest but then returned to athletics in Year 11 in High School.

Just before he turned 19, Riseley ran 1:52.7 for the 800m and in 2006 he clocked times of 1:49.0 for 800m and 3:48.91 for 1500m. Within 12 months, he ran times of 1:46.35 (800m) and 3:38.56 (1500m). Riseley's first major competition was the 2007 World Championships in Athletics, competing in the Men's 800 metres and finishing in 40th place with a time of 1:48.33. In the same year he also competed at the Summer Universiade competition.

Achievements 
Riseley competed at the 2009, 2011 and 2015 World championships. He won the 2009 Australian title, his first national title, in Brisbane. One of his finest achievements was running fifth in both the 800m and 1500m in the 2014 Commonwealth Games in Glasgow. Riseley won six 800m or 1500m national titles including the double in 2015, the first to achieve the double in 24 years.

Riseley had to withdraw from the 2015 Beijing World Championships due to requiring double plantar fascia surgery. He then returned to good form in Europe with two 1:45 runs, just outside the Olympic standard and then on June 20, 2020, he managed to run the 800m in 1:44.85, his fastest time for nine years.

In his Men's 800m heat at the 2020 Tokyo Olympics, Risely came fourth with a time of 1:45.41 and qualified for the semi-final, where he came fifth and did not progress to the final.

Off the track, Jeff has a double degree in exercise sports science and sports management at Deakin University and is currently studying a Masters in high performance sport at Australian Catholic University (ACU).

Competition record

References

External links
 
 
 
 

Australian male middle-distance runners
1986 births
Living people
Olympic athletes of Australia
Athletes (track and field) at the 2008 Summer Olympics
Athletes (track and field) at the 2012 Summer Olympics
Athletes (track and field) at the 2016 Summer Olympics
Athletes (track and field) at the 2020 Summer Olympics
Athletes (track and field) at the 2014 Commonwealth Games
Competitors at the 2007 Summer Universiade
World Athletics Championships athletes for Australia
Commonwealth Games competitors for Australia